Protocaptorhinus is an extinct genus of Early Permian (Cisuralian epoch) captorhinid reptile known from Texas of the United States. It is known from the holotype MCZ 1478, a three-dimensionally preserved partial skull. It was collected in the Rattlesnake Canyon site from the Petrolia Formation. It was first named by Clark and Carroll in 1973 and the type species is Protocaptorhinus pricei. The generic name means "first Captorhinus" (from Greek) and the specific name honours Llewellyn Ivor Price.

See also
 Geology of Wichita Falls, Texas

References

Fossils of the United States
Permian reptiles of North America
Fossil taxa described in 1973
Captorhinids
Prehistoric reptile genera